Highway 44 is a highway in the Canadian province of Saskatchewan. It runs from Highway 7 near Alsask to Highway 11 near Davidson. It crosses the South Saskatchewan River atop the Gardiner Dam. It also provides access to Danielson Provincial Park.

Contemporary issues
While the road has been in poor condition for years, in 2020 more appropriate repairs have been made making for safer travel. In 2021 additional investments were made on this road making for significant improvements.

Major intersections
From west to east:

References

External links
Danielson Provincial Park

044